The 2012–13 film awards season began in November 2012 and ended in February 2013.

Ballots were sent out begging from November.

Awards ceremonies

Films by awards gained

See also 
 Film awards seasons

Footnotes